Verdcourt is a surname. Notable people with the surname include:

Ann Verdcourt (born 1934), New Zealand artist
Bernard Verdcourt (1925–2011), English botanist and taxonomist